Kawacatoose 88 is an Indian reserve of the Kawacatoose First Nation in Saskatchewan.

References

Indian reserves in Saskatchewan
Division No. 10, Saskatchewan